The Karbala governorate election of 2013 was held on 20 April 2013 alongside elections for all other governorates outside Iraqi Kurdistan, Kirkuk, Anbar, and Nineveh.

Results 

|- style="background-color:#E9E9E9"
!align="left" colspan=2 valign=top|Party/Coalition!! Allied national parties !! Leader !!Seats !! Change !!Votes
|-
|bgcolor="#FF0000"|
|align=left|State of Law Coalition || ||Nouri Al-Maliki|| 7 || || 84,447
|-
|bgcolor="#000000"|
|align=left|Liberal Coalition|| ||Muqtada al-Sadr|| 4 || || 43,945
|-
|
|align=left|Al Liwa || || || 3 || || 33,614
|-
|bgcolor="#009933"|
|align=left|Citizens Alliance ||align=left| || Ammar al-Hakim|| 3 || || 33,362
|-
|
|align=left|Hope for the Mesopotamia || || || 3 || || 32,527
|-
|
|align=left|Equitable State Movement || || || 3 || || 32,454
|-
|
|align=left|National Moderation Front || || || 2 || || 18,501
|-
|
|align=left|Iraq’s Advocates for State Support || || || 1 || || 13,102
|-
|
|align=left|Iraqi Justice and Democracy Alliance || || || 1 || || 8,559
|-
|
|align=left|Karbala’s Independent Council of Tribe Chiefs and Dignitaries || || || || || 5,250
|-
|bgcolor="#098DCD"|
|align=left|Al Iraqia National and United Coalition || || align=left|Ayad Allawi || || || 4,887
|-
|
|align=left|Al Nahrayn Unity || || || || || 4,868
|-
|
|align=left|Karbala Houses Gathering || || || || || 2,886
|-
|bgcolor="#F6BE22"|
|align=left|Iraq’s Benevolence and Generosity List || || || || || 2,428
|-
|
|align=left|Free Iraqi Bloc || || || || || 2,150
|-
|
|align=left|Al Nahrayn National Movement || || || || || 746
|-
|colspan=2 align=left| Total || || || 27 || || 323,726
|-
|colspan=7 align=left|Sources: al-Sumaria - Karbala Coalitions, ISW, IHEC

References 

2013 Iraqi governorate elections
Karbala Governorate